The 2017 CAF Confederation Cup group stage was played from 12 May to 9 July 2017. A total of 16 teams competed in the group stage to decide the eight places in the knockout stage of the 2017 CAF Confederation Cup.

Draw

The draw for the group stage was held on 26 April 2017, 14:00 EET (UTC+2), at the CAF Headquarters in Cairo, Egypt. The 16 teams, all winners of the play-off round of qualifying, were drawn into four groups of four. The teams were seeded by their performances in the CAF competitions for the previous five seasons (CAF 5-Year Ranking points shown in parentheses).

Format

In the group stage, each group was played on a home-and-away round-robin basis. The winners and runners-up of each group advanced to the quarter-finals of the knockout stage.

Tiebreakers

The teams were ranked according to points (3 points for a win, 1 point for a draw, 0 points for a loss). If tied on points, tiebreakers were applied in the following order (Regulations III. 20 & 21):
Points in head-to-head matches among tied teams;
Goal difference in head-to-head matches among tied teams;
Goals scored in head-to-head matches among tied teams;
Away goals scored in head-to-head matches among tied teams;
If more than two teams are tied, and after applying all head-to-head criteria above, a subset of teams are still tied, all head-to-head criteria above are reapplied exclusively to this subset of teams;
Goal difference in all group matches;
Goals scored in all group matches;
Away goals scored in all group matches;
Drawing of lots.

Schedule
The schedule of each matchday was as follows (matches scheduled in midweek in italics).

Groups

Group A

Group B

Group C

Group D

References

External links
Total Confederation Cup 2017, CAFonline.com

2
May 2017 sports events in Africa
June 2017 sports events in Africa
July 2017 sports events in Africa